Alice Ansara is an Australian actress and dramaturg who works in film, television and theatre.

Background 
Ansara is the daughter of documentary filmmaker, Martha Ansara and Master Builder Bill Ethell. Ansara began working as an actor as a child and also traveled Australia whilst her mother made films. In her teens, she spent time in Colombia, South America, becoming fluent in Spanish. Ansara also signs Auslan (Australian Sign Language).  She attended the Australian Theatre for Young People in Sydney and later trained at the Western Australian Academy of Performing Arts.

She is the mother of two children, Mavis and Esther.

Career 
Ansara's first significant role was as young Cathy Ann in the award-winning Australian telemovie Breaking Through. She continued to work professionally across film and television into her adolescence. Before finishing high school, Ansara landed the lead role of Lucia in the 2001 Australian movie La Spagnola, which debuted at the Sydney Film Festival and garnered her Best Actress nominations at the 2001 Australian Film Institute Awards (now AACTA Awards) and the 2002 Film Critics Circle of Australia Awards.

After graduating from the Western Australian Academy of Performing Arts, Ansara starred in Rosebery 7470 for which she won a Best Actress Award at the 2006 Melbourne Underground Film Festival. She also began working in theatre, including with leading Australian companies: Sydney Theatre Company, Griffin Theatre Company, Monkey Baa Theatre and Bell Shakespeare. In 2009 Ansara was chosen by Artistic Directors Cate Blanchett and Andrew Upton as one of nine actors in the Sydney Theatre Company's acting ensemble known as "The Residents".

Ansara was part of the core cast of the TV comedy series Bogan Pride, playing Rebel Wilson's best friend Nigella. She has played various characters, including Lamees, in the first two seasons of Nazeem Hussain's television sketch comedy Legally Brown.

She has been a member of Actors Equity since 1989 and has served on the Management Committee of the Actors Benevolent Fund.

Ansara has directed two short documentaries in Auslan for The Deaf Society of NSW, including Jacobs Story, commissioned by the Australian Human Rights Commission. She has also served as a member of the Society's Centenary History sub-committee in the creation of the website Deaf in New South Wales: a Community History. In 2013 she received a Mike Walsh Fellowship to study deaf theatre practices in Scandinavia.

Ansara is a member of the Film & Broadcast Industries Oral History Group associated with Australia's National Film and Sound Archive for whom she records oral histories of Australian actors.

Filmography

Theatre

Radio

References 

Actresses from Sydney
Australian film actresses
Australian television actresses
Living people
Year of birth missing (living people)